Enskedefältet is a community of Söderort in Stockholm, Sweden.

References

Districts of Stockholm